Madlaine Traverse (born Mary Businsky; August 1, 1875 – January 7, 1964) was an American stage and screen actress from Cleveland, Ohio. In the course of her career she is alternately billed as "Madaline Traverse", "Madeline Traverse" and "Madeline Travers".

Silent movie actress

Traverse was a leading lady of the Fox Film Corporation in the second decade of the twentieth century. In 1917 she played the mother of Mary Pickford in The Poor Little Rich Girl (1917). In What Would You Do? (1920) director Edmund Lawrence required Traverse to wear the clothes of a Boer woman of South Africa. Lawrence stressed realism to the point of insisting that Traverse not wash her face for several days before her scenes were shot.

Her most successful films are The Caillaux Case (1918) and Three Weeks (1914). In 1920 she made her first movie for Madlaine Traverse Productions, Snares of Paris (1919), in New York City. Her wardrobe for the motion picture was purchased in Paris and she stayed in Fort Lee, New Jersey while on location.

Traverse was rescued from drowning while she was bathing at high tide in the Pacific Ocean in October 1918. A man who was swimming nearby noticed Traverse did not come to the surface after struggling with strong waves. He pulled her by her skirt and took her to safety from the water off the coast of Ocean Park, California.

She became an avid duck hunter in southern California after settling there to make motion pictures.

Madlaine Traverse died in Cleveland in 1964.

Additional information

Madlaine Traverse's birth name was Mary Businsky. She was born August 1, 1875. Madlaine began her acting career on the stage in England. She married Max Traverse, who died in 1906. The lights from filming permanently damaged her eyes, forcing her into retirement. Mary Pickford, who starred with her in Poor Little Rich Girl, visited her in 1962, which was the highlight of her retirement years. She was 88 when she died January 7, 1964.

Filmography
 Leah Kleschna (1913)
  (1914)
 The Closing Net (1915)
 Fruits of Desire (1916)
 The Shielding Shadow (1916)
 The Poor Little Rich Girl (1917) (*Survives)
 Sins of Ambition (1917) (*survives LoC)
 The Caillaux Case (1918)
 The Danger Zone (1918)
 Gambling in Souls (1919)
 The Love That Dares (1919)
 When Fate Decides (1919)
 Rose of the West (1919)
 The Splendid Sin (1919)
 Snares of Paris (1919)
 Lost Money (1919)
 What Would You Do? (1920)
 The Hell Ship (1920)
 The Tattlers (1920)
 The Iron Heart (1920)
 The Spirit of Good (1920)
 The Penalty (1920)

References

Fort Wayne Journal-Gazette, Madlaine Traverse Hunts, Sunday Morning, November 23, 1919, Section Four, Page 8.
Los Angeles Times, Flashes, Star Nearly Drowns, October 4, 1918, Page II3.
Los Angeles Times, Madlaine Traverse Was Rather Shocked, August 24, 1919, Page III15.
Los Angeles Times, Madlaine Traverse Plans Costume Innovation, May 13, 1920, Page II7.

External links

 still of Madlaine Traverse (Univ. of Washington, Sayre collection)-Wayback version.....new url version
A portrait of Madlaine Traverse in side profile, 1919 (Univ. of Washington, Sayre collection)

American stage actresses
American silent film actresses
Western (genre) film actresses
Actresses from Cleveland
1875 births
1964 deaths
20th-century American actresses